Waldo Goronwy Williams (30 September 1904 – 20 May 1971) was one of the leading Welsh-language poets of the 20th century. He was also a notable Christian pacifist, anti-war campaigner, and Welsh nationalist. He is often referred to by his first name only.

Life
Waldo Goronwy Williams was born in Haverfordwest, Pembrokeshire, the third child of John Edwal Williams (1863–1934), headmaster of Prendergast primary school in Haverfordwest, and his wife Angharad Williams (1875–1932). His father spoke both Welsh and English, but his mother only spoke English, as did Waldo himself in his early years.

In 1911 Waldo's father was appointed head of the primary school at Mynachlog-ddu, Pembrokeshire. There Waldo learnt to speak Welsh. In 1915 his father moved again, to be head of Brynconin School, the primary school at Llandissilio, Pembrokeshire. Waldo was raised as a Baptist and baptised as a member of Blaenconin Baptist Chapel in 1921 at the age of 16.

After attending the grammar school at Narberth, Pembrokeshire, Williams studied at the University College of Wales, Aberystwyth, where he graduated in English in 1926. He then trained as a teacher and worked in various schools in Pembrokeshire and the rest of Wales and England, including Kimbolton School, Huntingdonshire. He also taught night classes for the Department of Extra-Mural Studies at the University College of Wales, Aberystwyth.

In the 1920s and 1930s, Williams was a friend and supporter of Willie Jenkins (Hoplas), one of the pioneers of the Independent Labour Party (ILP) and the Labour Party in Pembrokeshire. Jenkins was a pacifist, who had been imprisoned as a conscientious objector in the First World War. He stood as Labour candidate for Pembrokeshire in four elections between 1922 and 1935. Williams's famous poem "Cofio" (Remembering) was written in 1931 during a visit to Willie Jenkins's farm at Hoplas, Rhoscrowther, near Pembroke.

Williams married Linda Llewellyn in 1941. Her death in 1943 caused him anguish and distress. He never remarried. Later he would describe his two-year  marriage as "fy mlynyddoedd mawr" – "my great years".

A pacifist, he was a conscientious objector in the Second World War, which led to his dismissal from a headmastership. During the Korean War (1950–1953) he refused to pay his income tax on pacifist grounds as a protest against the war and forced military conscription – a protest he continued until compulsory military service ended in 1963 and all the conscripted had been released. His goods were sequestrated by bailiffs and he was twice imprisoned in the early 1960s for refusing to pay his income tax.

Meanwhile in the 1950s he joined the Quakers at Milford Haven.

Williams's volume of poetry Dail Pren (Leaves of the Tree) was published in 1956 by Gwasg Gomer. It has been described as the most outstanding work of Welsh language poetry published since 1945.

By the 1950s, partly influenced by his friend D. J. Williams, he had become a supporter of Plaid Cymru and stood for it as a parliamentary candidate in the Pembrokeshire constituency at the 1959 General Election, winning 4.32 per cent (2,253) of the votes.

In the late 1960s, Williams taught Welsh to children of 10–11 at the Holy Name Catholic School, Fishguard, Pembrokeshire. He is said to have been a mesmerising teacher, passionate and enthusiastic, who used wooden silhouettes of farm animals with their names painted in Welsh on one side.

Death and legacy
Williams died in 1971 at St Thomas's Hospital, Haverfordwest, and was buried at Blaenconin Chapel burial ground in Llandissilio. There is a memorial at Rhos-fach, near to his childhood home in Mynachlog-ddu.

In 2019, Waldo Williams Primary School in Haverfordwest was named in his honour.

The Waldo Williams room at Friends House, London, UK is named after him.

Poetry

Waldo Williams's poetry shows many influences, ranging from William Wordsworth and Walt Whitman to Welsh hymns and the strict alliterative metres of traditional Welsh poetry, known as cynghanedd.

This drew on the cooperative, harmonious living he witnessed in the farming communities in the Preseli Hills and reflected feelings of belonging, knowing and desiring that people live together in peace – constant themes in his poetry. This revelation inspired some of his greatest poetry, including "Mewn dau gae" (In two fields, 1956), perhaps his greatest of all. Other well-known poems of his include "Cofio" (Remembering, 1931), "Y tangnefeddwyr" (The peacemakers, 1941), "Preseli" (1946), and "Pa beth yw dyn?" (What is it to be human? 1952).

Important events in life
1911 – Moves to Mynachlog-ddu, Pembrokeshire, when his father becomes head of the primary school.
1915 – Moves to Llandissilio, Pembrokeshire, when his father is appointed head of the primary school.
1917 – Attends grammar school at Narberth.
1923 – Begins studies at University College of Wales, Aberystwyth.
1926 – Graduates in English and trains as a teacher.
1928 – Begins to teach at various primary schools in Pembrokeshire.
1931 – "Cofio" (Remembering) – inspired by a visit to the farm of his friend Willie Jenkins at Hoplas, Rhoscrowther
1936 – Publication of Cerddi'r plant (Poems for Children) jointly with E Llwyd Williams
1938 – "Y Tŵr a'r Graig" (The Tower and the Rock) – a milestone in which Waldo contrasts the independent judgement he valued in a Pembrokeshire community with the militarism of the state
1941 – Marries Linda Llewellyn in Blaenconin chapel (April)
1941 – "Y tangnefeddwyr" (The peacemakers) – a poem of love for his parents and peacemakers, and of horror at the bombing of Swansea
1942 – Conscientious objector to military service on pacifist grounds, conditionally exempted by the South Wales Tribunal sitting at Carmarthen (February 1942)
1942 – Moves from Pembrokeshire with his wife to the Llŷn Peninsula in north-west Wales, to teach at Botwnnog County School (1 March 1942).  
1943 – Linda Llewellyn dies of tuberculosis on 1 June 1943. Waldo is grief-stricken.
1945 – Leaves Llŷn for England, working in schools in Kimbolton and Lyneham, Wiltshire, 1945–1948. 
1949 – Returns to Wales as a supply teacher in Builth Wells.
1950 – Returns to Pembrokeshire for the rest of his life, teaching in schools and at extramural classes.
1950 – The Korean War: Williams resigns from teaching to begin a protest of non-payment of income tax against the war. This continues until the end of compulsory military service in 1963. Bailiffs sequestrated his possessions and ultimately he was imprisoned. 
1953 – Joins the Religious Society of Friends (Quakers).
1956 – Publication of Dail Pren (The Leaves of the Tree)
1959 – Stands as Plaid Cymru candidate in the Pembrokeshire constituency at the general election. Receives 2,253 votes (4.3%).
1960 – Imprisoned for six weeks in Swansea Prison for non-payment of income tax. 
1961 – Imprisoned again for non-payment of income tax, in Ashwell Prison, Rutland, in February–March 1961. 
1963 – Resumes teaching at various primary schools in Pembrokeshire.
1971 – Suffers a stroke and dies in St Thomas's Hospital, Haverfordwest.

Published works
Dail Pren (The Leaves of the Tree, 1956), the only volume of poetry for adults published by Williams in his lifetime; a new edition published in 1991 by Gwasg Gomer, with an introduction by Mererid Hopwood
Cerddi Waldo Williams (The Poems of Waldo Williams) (1992), a selection of his poetry edited by J. E. Caerwyn Williams
Waldo Williams: rhyddiaith (Waldo Williams: Prose) (2001), edited by Damian Walford Davies – a selection of Williams' prose writings in both Welsh and English
Cerddi'r plant (Poems for children, 1936), a volume of poetry including work by Waldo Williams and E. Llwyd Williams
The Old Farmhouse (1961) – Waldo Williams's translation into English of Yr hen dy ffarm by D. J. Williams (1953)
Waldo Williams: Cerddi 1922–1970 (Poems 1922–1970) (2012), ed. Alan Llwyd and Robert Rhys – a comprehensive collection of Williams' poetry

Translations of his work
A significant collection of Williams's poetry has been translated into English by Tony Conran.

See also
List of peace activists

Notes

References

English-language sources
Nicholas, James (1975). Waldo Williams. Cardiff: University of Wales Press. A general introduction to Williams's life and work.
Williams, Waldo; trans. Tony Conran (1997). The Peacemakers: selected poems. Poems in Welsh with parallel English translations by Tony Conran. With an introduction by Conran to Waldo Williams's life and work. Llandysul: Gomer (1997).   
'Williams, Waldo Goronwy (1904–1971), poet and pacifist', Robert Rhys (2017) Dictionary of Welsh Biography, National Library of Wales. With photographs of Waldo from the National Library's collection.
Chríost, D. M. G. (2013) "Waldo Williams Dail Pren (1956)". In: Welsh Writing, Political Action and Incarceration. Palgrave Studies in Minority Languages and Communities. Palgrave Macmillan, London. Print . Online

Welsh-language sources
Davies, Damien Walford (2001). Waldo Williams: rhyddiaith. Caerdydd: Gwasg Prifysgol Cymru. ISBN. Includes critical introductions, and notes to the texts, and both his Welsh-language and English-language prose.
Nicholas, James (editor) (1977). Waldo: cyfrol deyrnged i Waldo Williams. Llandysul: Gwasg Gomer. A collection of articles about Williams's life and work
Rhys, Robert (editor) (1981). Waldo Williams. Cyfres y meistri. Abertawe: Gwasg Christopher Davies. ISBN. A collection of articles about Williams's life and work
Rhys, Robert (1992). Chwilio am nodau'r gân: astudiaeth o yrfa lenyddol Waldo Williams hyd at 1939. Llandysul: Gwasg Gomer. ISBN. A study of Williams's literary career until 1939. An appendix includes a significant collection of his early poems not published in Dail pren.
Thomas, Ned (1985). Waldo. Llên y llenor. Caernarfon: Gwasg Pantycelyn. A general introduction to Williams's life and poetry
Llwyd, Alan (2014) Waldo: Cofiant Waldo Williams 1904–1971 (Biography and Bibliography)

External links
 – Waldo Williams was headteacher of the school
 – Lecture, with audio recording

1904 births
1971 deaths
Welsh-language poets
Alumni of Aberystwyth University
Academics of Aberystwyth University
British conscientious objectors
Welsh conscientious objectors
Converts to Quakerism
Welsh Quakers
Welsh Christian pacifists
People from Haverfordwest
Plaid Cymru politicians
20th-century Welsh poets
20th-century Quakers